Website popularity is commonly determined using the number of unique users, and the metric is often quoted to potential advertisers or investors. A website's number of unique users is usually measured over a standard period of time, typically a month.

Limitations
Use of performance indicators like unique visitors/users has been criticized. Greg Harmon of Belden Research inferred that many companies reporting their online performance "may overstate" the number of unique visitors due to the limitations of the metric. This is because an increasing number of people now access websites through multiple physical devices with different IP addresses, and thus may be counted multiple times. Websites that track users using cookies instead of IP addresses are not safe either, as some users regularly delete cookies from their devices, and others may use multiple web browsers to access a single website. This means that for a typical news site, for example, which people might visit more than once a day to keep up with breaking news, the reported number of unique users may overstate the number of different people by a factor of four.

Understanding Unique Users Numbers
Similar to the TURF (Total Unduplicated Reach and Frequency) metric often used in television, radio and newspaper analyses, Unique Users is a measure of the distribution of content to a number of distinct consumers.

A common mistake in using Unique User numbers is adding up Unique User numbers across dimensions. A Unique User metric is only valid for its given set of dimensions e.g. time, browsers. For example, a website may have 100 unique users on each day (day being the dimension) of a particular week. With only this data, one cannot extrapolate the number of weekly Unique Users (only that the Unique User count for the week is between 100 and 700). However, website administrators who can track unique user traffic over a longer period of time can build up a reliable view on their performance against direct competitors within the sector. Online businesses tend to have a static conversion rate between unique users and new business clients.

When calculating movement of unique users through the conversion funnel, the same time period must be used at every step.

Unique visitor
Unique visitors refers to the number of distinct individuals requesting pages from a website during a given period, regardless of how often they visit. Because a visitor can make multiple visits in a specified period, the number of visits may be greater than the number of visitors. A visitor is sometimes referred to as a unique visitor or a unique user to clearly convey the idea that each visitor is only counted once.

The purpose of tracking unique visitors is to help marketers understand website user behavior.

The measurement of users or visitors requires a standard time period and can be distorted by automatic activity (such as bots) that classify web content. Estimation of visitors, visits, and other traffic statistics are usually filtered to remove this type of activity by eliminating known IP addresses for bots, by requiring registration or cookies, or by using panel data.

See also
 Active users
 Hit (Internet)
 Registered user
 Web traffic
 Web analytics

Further reading

Notes

Advertising indicators
Web analytics
Network addressing

fr:Audience d'un site Web#Définitions et vocabulaire